Chris Scott Mandeville (born February 1, 1965) is a former American football defensive back in the National Football League, he played one year for the Washington Redskins, two years for the Green Bay Packers, and preseason football for the San Francisco 49ers. He played college football at the University of California-Davis. He set a record with 165 yards in a game with only one dropped pass his whole entire career in college.

High school years
Christopher S. Mandeville attended Irvine High School, and was a student and letter man in football and track and field. In track and field, he was an All-California Interstate Federation athlete and broke the school record in the long jump and the triple jump.

References

1965 births
Living people
Sportspeople from Santa Barbara, California
American football safeties
UC Davis Aggies football players
Washington Redskins players
Green Bay Packers players
Sportspeople from Irvine, California